Cecil Torr (11 October 1857, Mitcham, London – 17 December 1928) was a British antiquarian and author.

After education at Harrow School, Cecil Torr matriculated on 7 June 1876 at Trinity College, Cambridge, graduating there B.A. 1880 and M.A. 1883. He was admitted in 1879 at the Inner Temple and was called to the Bar in 1882.

He lived in Wreyland, Dartmoor and wrote Small Talk at Wreyland (3 vols., 1918–1923); the first volume was an unexpected commercial success. His 1894 book Ancient Ships deals with the structure of ships that sailed the Mediterranean in 1000 B.C. – 1000 A.D.

Selected publications

References

External links

English antiquarians
19th-century English writers
20th-century English writers
People educated at Harrow School
Alumni of Trinity College, Cambridge
1857 births
1928 deaths
Members of the Inner Temple
Writers from Devon